Juan Daniel Roa Reyes (born 20 August 1991) is a Colombian professional footballer who plays as a midfielder for Categoría Primera A club Deportivo Cali.

Club career
Born in Bogotá, Roa began his career playing for Santa Fe's youth set-up after catching the eye of club president César Pastrana. Following an impressive youth career with the club, Roa was promoted to the first team in 2010 and played for Santa Fe for nine years, winning three league titles, three Superligas, the Copa Sudamericana in 2015, and the 2016 Suruga Bank Championship.

After his contract with Santa Fe expired at the end of 2019, on 11 January 2020 Roa joined Deportivo Cali under a one-year contract.

Career statistics

Club

Notes

Honours

Club 
Santa Fe
Copa Sudamericana: 2015
Categoría Primera A: 2012-I, 2014-II, 2016–II
Superliga Colombiana: 2013, 2015, 2017
Suruga Bank Championship: 2016

References

External links
 
 

1991 births
Living people
Colombian footballers
Association football midfielders
Categoría Primera A players
Independiente Santa Fe footballers
Deportivo Cali footballers
Colombia international footballers
Footballers from Bogotá